St. Joseph's School, Kendrapara, is a private Catholic primary and secondary school, located in Kendrapara, Odisha, India. Established in 1996, the school is run by the Jesuits working under the Loyola Educational Society and established by the Archdiocese of Cuttack-Bhubaneswar. It is the only Indian Certificate of Secondary Education English-medium school in Kendrapara. It is a coeducational, minority school.

Academics
Although English is the medium of instruction, Oriya and Hindi have a vital role in the curriculum. It aims at imparting a holistic education, training men and women for and with others. It is situated in a large, three-storey building and has sports facilities.

Activities
Activities include Scouts and Guides, Arts Club, Literary Club, Science Club, News Bulletin, School Choir, Oriya Club, Computer Club, Social Service Club, Eco Club and National Cadet Corps. There is also an active Alumni Club.

See also

 Catholic Church in India
 Christianity in Odisha
 List of schools in Odisha
 List of Jesuit schools

References

External links
 , the school's official website

Jesuit secondary schools in India
Co-educational schools in India
Jesuit primary schools in India
High schools and secondary schools in Odisha
Christian schools in Odisha
Kendrapara district
Educational institutions established in 1996
1996 establishments in Orissa